Pedro Tavares Ferreira (born 20 March 2000) is a Portuguese footballer who plays for CF Canelas 2010 as a midfielder.

Football career
He made his professional debut for Oliveirense on 12 September 2020 in the Liga Portugal 2.

References

External links

2000 births
Living people
People from Oliveira de Azeméis
Portuguese footballers
Association football midfielders
Liga Portugal 2 players
U.D. Oliveirense players
Sportspeople from Aveiro District